Amida-ji (阿弥陀寺) is a Buddhist temple located in Sakuragata, Okazaki, Aichi. It belongs to the Seizanfukakusa-ha of Jōdo Shū.
 
The temple is also known as Ōshōsan Amida-ji, Daikinkokuzan Saifuku-in (應聲山阿彌陀寺・大金谷山西福院).

History
As the temple serves as the Takiwaki-Matsudaira family's bodai-ji, it has strong historical ties with the bushi class.

Cultural Property
Mandala Butsue-zu

See also
Jōdo Shū

References

Buddhist temples in Aichi Prefecture